Santagata is a surname which was derived from Saint Agatha known as Agatha of Sicily. It has origins from Caserta and Naples. Notable people with the surname include:

Giulio Santagata (born 1949), Italian politician
Marco Santagata (1947−2020), Italian academic, writer, and literary critic
Sandro Santagata, American physician and academic

Stage name
Toni Santagata, stage name of Antonio Morese (1935–2021), Italian folk singer

References

Surnames of Italian origin